Dulhan may refer to:

 Dulhan (1938 film), a 1938 social Hindi film
 Dulhan (1958 film), a 1958 Hindi-language film
 Dulhan (1975 film), a 1975 Hindi film
 Dulhan (TV series), a 2020 Pakistani serial by Momina Duraid